Giannelli is an Italian surname. Notable people with the surname include:

Alessandro Giannelli (born 1963), Italian former racing cyclist
Fred Giannelli (born 1960), American electronic musician
Mario Giannelli (1920–2003) nicknamed "Yo-Yo", American football guard in the National Football League
Paul Giannelli (born 1945), American lawyer, consultant and law professor
Pietro Giannelli (1807–1881), Italian cardinal
Ray Giannelli (born 1966), former American Major League Baseball third baseman
Simone Giannelli (born 1996), Italian volleyball player

See also
Giannelli Imbula, (born 1992), French professional footballer

Italian-language surnames
Patronymic surnames
Surnames from given names